Waterloo Pier may refer to:

 Waterloo Millennium Pier, the passenger boat service pier on the River Thames, London, UK
 Tower Lifeboat Station, formerly the Waterloo Police Pier, the base of the Royal National Lifeboat Institution's lifeboat service on the River Thames, London, UK